Mangu Deh (also Romanized as Mangū Deh; also known as Maskūdeh) is a village in Pir Bazar Rural District, in the Central District of Rasht County, Gilan Province, Iran. At the 2006 census, its population was 1,020, in 280 families.

References 

Populated places in Rasht County